John West was an Australian poet and the author of numerous books of poetry published in Australia between 1994 and his death in 2009. He died just before his Selected Poems was finalised for publication. Several hundred of his individual poems were published in his lifetime, mostly in Australia but also in the UK. He was raised in the Mallee town of Merbein, Victoria, and worked as an aged care nurse in Melbourne. His work is known for its conversational approach and compassionate social realism.

His books include Stuttering Towards Love (Walleah Press 2000); All I Ever Wanted was a Window (Pardalote Press 2002); Couchworld (Picaro Press 2006); and Walking Amongst Women (Picaro Press 2006).

References

External links
 Website

Australian poets
2009 deaths
Year of birth missing